Richard Francis Xavier Casten (born November 1, 1941, in New York City) is an American nuclear physicist, known for Casten's triangle (introduced in 1981).

Education and career
He graduated from secondary school at Friends Seminary in Manhattan. He received his bachelor's degree in 1963 from the College of the Holy Cross, where he was influenced by Edward Francis Kennedy (1932–2017). At Yale University's physics department, Casten graduated in 1964 with an M.S. and in 1967 with a Ph.D. His thesis entitled Collective nuclear structure studies in the osmium nuclei was supervised by D. Allan Bromley and Jack S. Greenberg (1927–2005). Casten's thesis was the first based upon research done with Yale's MP-1 tandem accelerator. As a postdoc he was a research fellow from 1967 to 1969 at Copenhagen's Niels Bohr Institute and from 1969 to 1971 at Los Alamos National Laboratory. From 1971 to 1997 he worked in Brookhaven National Laboratory's Nuclear Structure Group, being promoted from assistant physicist to physicist and then to Senior Scientist in 1981. At Yale University he was a full professor from 1995 to 2008 and the D. Allan Bromley Professor of Physics from 2008 to 2015, when he retired as professor emeritus. From 1995 to 2008 he was also the director of Yale's Wright Nuclear Structure Laboratory (WNSL). In the summer of 2011, WNSL's accelerator was shut down.

Casten has been an associate editor for Physical Review C for experimental nuclear structure. He held visiting positions at the Institut Laue–Langevin, at the University of Cologne's Institute for Nuclear Physics, at the CERN/ISOLDE facility, and at Stony Brook University. He chaired from 2003 to 2005 the United States Department of Energy's Nuclear Science Advisory Committee (NSAC), in 2008 the American Physical Society's Division of Nuclear Physics (DNP), and from 2009 to 2012 the FRIB Science Advisory Committee.

He was elected in 1981 a fellow of the American Physical Society (APS) and in 1987 a fellow of the American Association for the Advancement of Science. In 1983 he received a Humboldt Award for Senior US Scientists. He was awarded honorary doctorates by the University of Bucharest and the University of Surrey.

In 2009 he received the Mentoring Award from the Nuclear Physics Section of the APS. In 2011 he received the Tom W. Bonner Prize in Nuclear Physics.

Selected publications

Articles
 
 
 
 
  (over 950 citations)

Books
  
 as editor:

References

External links
 
 
 
 
 

1941 births
Living people
20th-century American physicists
21st-century American physicists
Accelerator physicists
American nuclear physicists
Friends Seminary alumni
College of the Holy Cross alumni
Yale Graduate School of Arts and Sciences alumni
Yale University faculty
Fellows of the American Physical Society
Fellows of the American Association for the Advancement of Science
Brookhaven National Laboratory staff